The Belgian Lion Award (Dutch: Belgische Leeuw, French:  Lion Belge) is a football  award in Belgium given annually to the best Maghreb player of Arab / Amazigh origin in the Belgian First Division A. Recently, secondary awards have also been handed out to the best footballer abroad, youngster, female footballer, coach and futsal player.

Winners

Breakdown of winners

By country of origin

By club

References

Belgian football trophies and awards
Annual events in Belgium